Notata is a genus of moths in the subfamily Arctiinae.

Species
 Notata modicus (Lucas, 1892)
 Notata parva Hampson, 1891
 Notata zumkehri de Vos & van Mastrigt, 2007

References
 Entomofauna 28(18): 213-240.
 Natural History Museum Lepidoptera generic names catalog

Nudariina
Moth genera